Ewelina Dobrowolska (former spelling Evelina Dobrovolska; born 16 August 1988) is a Polish-Lithuanian politician and activist. She was elected to the Seimas on behalf of the Freedom Party in 2020.

On 7 December 2020, she was appointed to serve as Minister of Justice in the Šimonytė Cabinet, succeeding Elvinas Jankevičius in that role.

Biography
In 2010 she graduated BA in law from the Mykolas Romeris University and the following year she started working as an Assistant Attorney at a law firm. She became a member of the European Foundation of Human Rights. She became involved in social activities in the field of combating discrimination and protecting human rights. She represented among others numerous persons in court proceedings concerning the original spelling of surnames.

In 2019 she ran for the Vilnius City Council and she became a Councillor at the beginning of 2020. In the same year, she ran in the parliamentary elections from the list of the liberal Freedom Party. She was then elected as Member of the Seimas.

In May 2022, she changed the spelling of her name to reflect her Polish ethnicity, after a law was passed which allowed Lithuanian citizens to use non-Lithuanian Latin characters in their identity documents.

See also 
 Poles in Lithuania

References 

1988 births
21st-century Lithuanian politicians
21st-century Lithuanian women politicians
Freedom Party (Lithuania) politicians
Living people
Members of the Seimas
Politicians from Vilnius
Women members of the Seimas
Lithuanian people of Polish descent
Ministers of Justice of Lithuania
Female justice ministers
Women government ministers of Lithuania
Mykolas Romeris University alumni